Vellankoil is a village located in Erode District in the state of Tamil Nadu, India.

Villages in Erode district